Aubrey Patrick Watts (born 21 November 1955 in Farnborough, Kent) is a British auto racing driver. He excelled in single make series in the eighties and competed in saloons in the nineties, mainly in the British Touring Car Championship. He still makes occasional appearances in historic racing events.

Racing career

Early career
His first title came in 1979, winning the National Mini 850 Championship. Between 1980 and 1982 he drove in various saloon cars before getting his first taste of the BTCC for Rover Metro Team in 1983 and 1984. In 1986 he raced in the Fiat Uno Turbo Championship. More titles followed, winning the inaugural Honda CRX Championship in 1988, and again in 1990. Also that year he won the Mazda MX5 championship. In 1991 he stepped up to the ESSO Production Saloon Car Championship, winning yet another title with a Peugeot 309.

BTCC Mazda

His success in 1991 earned him a drive in the 1992 British Touring Car Championship for the new works Shell Mazda Racing Team in a Mazda 323. The one car the team put out was not on the pace of most of the other works teams, and he finished the season in sixteenth place. In 1993, the team switched to a distinctively painted single Mazda Xedos 6. The new car performed much better than the 323 although easy down on power compared to its rivals. The Xedos did manage to get some promising results throughout the year; Patrick lead races and qualified on the front row on more than one occasion. Unfortunately his season was spoiled by often being caught up in several incidents, and he ended the championship in fifteenth place. Mazda did not continue to run a team in 1994, despite showing promise in 1993 [although a team of 2 semi-works cars ran half of the season].

BTCC Peugeot

In 1994 he replaced Robb Gravett in the Peugeot Sport team with the Peugeot 405. A good year for both driver and team saw him end the year in eighth place, including four podium finishes. Team mate for 1994, Eugene O'Brien, was replaced by newcomer Simon Harrison in 1995. A slightly more troubled season ended with Watts in tenth place with two podiums.
The new look Total Team Peugeot had a new car in 1996 with the all new Peugeot 406, along with a new team mate for Watts. Harrison was replaced with 1992 champion and fellow Farnborough racer Tim Harvey. It what was always going to be a year of learning for Peugeot, the car failed to perform on the track, and he finished one down in sixteenth place, one position behind Harvey the lowest position for a works driver. 
Despite higher hopes for 1997 with MSD running the team, the car performed little better despite an improvement towards the end of the season. In Germany the car was dominating but the British effort struggled mainly due to internal team problems and budget restrictions. Again he finished the year down in sixteenth. With the team struggling, he left at the end of the year following a final race at that year's Bathurst 1000 teamed with Neil Crompton, but failing to finish. He was replaced in 1998 by Paul Radisich who found the team a problem also and fared even worse than Patrick.

Post BTCC
He competed in the first two rounds of the Australian Super Touring Championship in 1999 (Peugeot 406), winning one race at round one and finishing 2nd in both races of round two  After that he has done a few rallies including the Armajaro British Historic Rally Championship which he won in 2006 and finished second in 2007. His Touring Car efforts of the nineties were recognised in 2004 when he was selected to drive in the BTCC Masters, where his race ended after a collision with Jason Plato.
He now competes in an Allard J2 and FIA mustang and has recently bought the ex-works Computervision MG Metro Turbo he used in BTCC in 1984 and Peugeot 406 that he used successfully in Australia in 1999.

In 2017, Watts drove in the Dunlop Endurance championship in Cuda Drinks-entered Ginetta G50 with Richard Burrows. They finished 24th in race one and 13th in race two at Silverstone.

Patrick is CEO of recycling company Sweeep Kuusakoski, one of the biggest recyclers of electronic components in the world.

Racing record

Complete British Saloon / Touring Car Championship results
(key) (Races in bold indicate pole position - 1 point awarded 1996 onwards all races, 1983-88 in class) (Races in italics indicate fastest lap - 1 point awarded 1983-88 in class)

† Not eligible for points.

‡ Endurance driver.

Complete European Touring Car Championship results

(key) (Races in bold indicate pole position) (Races in italics indicate fastest lap)

Complete Australian Super Touring Championship results
(key) (Races in bold indicate pole position - 1 point awarded) (Races in italics indicate fastest lap)

Complete Bathurst 1000 results

* Super Touring race

Complete Britcar results 
(key) (Races in bold indicate pole position in class – 1 point awarded just in first race) (Races in italics indicate fastest lap in class – 1 point awarded all races)

References

External links
 BTCC Pages Profile.

British Touring Car Championship drivers
1956 births
Living people
People from Farnborough, London
Britcar drivers
Ginetta GT4 Supercup drivers
Peugeot Sport drivers